Navy Captain Eben Ibim Princewill  was Military Governor of Cross River State, Nigeria  between 1986 and December 1989, during the military regime of General Ibrahim Babangida.
He was allowed to retire from the navy with full benefits at the end of his term in office.

See also
List of Governors of Cross River State

References

Nigerian Navy officers
1946 births
Living people
Nigerian military governors of Cross River State